Tsuen Wan is a football team which is now an associate member of HKFA which does not participate in any division of the existing league. It is different from the Tsuen Wan team which participates in the Hong Kong Third 'District' Division League.

The team entered the formed Third Division League in 1969–70. In the next season, the team was promoted to Second Division and captured the title immediately. In 1971–72, the team played its first First Division League season. It is the second team which got promoted from Third Division to First Division after Yuen Long. However, it relegated to Second Division again immediately in that season (26 matches played: 7 wins, 7 draws, 12 losses, 21 points).

In 1980–81, the team was promoted to First Division again by finishing a second place in the last season. However, it stayed in the bottom half of the league in the following 3 seasons (8th in 1980–1981, 6th in 1981–1982, 9th in 1982–1983). In 1983, Tsuen Wan rejected HKFA's retain offer and relegated to Second Division League.

In 1984–85, the team promoted to the First Division for the third time after finishing second in Second Division. Despite finishing at the bottom in that season, Tsuen Wan was retained by HKFA again to stay in First Division and the offer was accepted this time. The best league position achieved was 5th place in 1986–87. The team was also a 2 times runner-up for Hong Kong Senior Shield).

The team quit the league due to financial problems in 1989.

League Position History
1969–70: Third Division
1970–71: Champion (Second Division)
1971–72: Relegated (First Division)
1972–73: Second Division
1973–74: Second Division
1974–75: Second Division
1975–76: Second Division
1976–77: Second Division
1977–78: Second Division
1978–79: Second Division
1979–80: 2nd (Second Division)
1980–81: 8th
1981–82: 6th
1982–83: 9th (rejected HKFA's retain offer and relegated to Second Division League)
1983–84: 2nd (Second Division) 
1984–85: Last place (retained by HKFA to stay in First Division)
1985–86: 6th
1986–87: 5th (Runners-up for Hong Kong Senior Shield and Viceroy Cup)
1987–88: 7th (Runners-up for Hong Kong Senior Shield and Hong Kong FA Cup)
1988–89: 7th

Notable players
  Gerry Creane (格連尼) (1982–83)
  Chris Galvin (加雲) (1981–83)
  Terry Lees (1982)
  Stuart Parker (柏克) (1981–82)
 Dave Roberts (羅拔士) (1981–83)

References
 甲組聯賽與地區球隊(二) (in Chinese)
 甲組聯賽與地區球隊(三) (in Chinese)

Defunct football clubs in Hong Kong